Magdi Mehanna (born Dakahlia Governorate, Egypt, 1956-2008) was an Egyptian journalist and the founding editor of Al-Masry Al-Youm newspaper, where he authored a column entitled "In the Forbidden Zone."  He also presented a talk show with the same name on Dream TV. Before that, he worked as a reporter and columnist for the leftist Al-Ahaly and the liberal Al-Wafd.

References

1957 births
2008 deaths
Cairo University alumni
Egyptian journalists
20th-century journalists